Magomedkhan Aratsilov (born 7 May 1951) is a Soviet former wrestler who competed in the 1980 Summer Olympics. He was born in Khurukh.

References

External links
 

1951 births
Living people
People from Charodinsky District
Soviet male sport wrestlers
Olympic wrestlers of the Soviet Union
Wrestlers at the 1980 Summer Olympics
Olympic silver medalists for the Soviet Union
Olympic medalists in wrestling
Medalists at the 1980 Summer Olympics
Sportspeople from Dagestan